Mazalem Kam (also Romanized as Maz̧alem Kam) is a village in Khotbeh Sara Rural District, Kargan Rud District, Talesh County, Gilan Province, Iran. At the 2006 census, its population was 41, in 10 families.

References 

Populated places in Talesh County